

Solomontown railway station was one of a total of six stations that operated at various times between 1876 and the early 2010s to serve the rural maritime town (later city) of Port Pirie, 216 km (134 mi) by rail north of Adelaide, South Australia. It was opened in 1911 as the town's third (and ultimately final) narrow-gauge station. It was closed in 1967, when narrow-gauge passenger services ceased.

Origins
In 1911, the South Australian Railways initiated a local passenger service on the narrow-gauge line leading into the hinterland from Port Pirie's docks. A station was declared at the latter location on Railway Terrace, which at that time was the southern boundary of a lightly inhabited area called Solomontown. Infrastructure consisted of only a signboard and a small wooden shelter; an unpaved compacted earth area for boarding trains from ground level served in lieu of a platform, as at all South Australian narrow-gauge stations. Without staff deployed there, it was officially known as a "provisional stopping place", marked on public timetables with an asterisk and a note stating "Stop, if required, to pick up or set down passengers".

Multi-gauge era
In 1937, two new lines – broad gauge from Adelaide and standard gauge from Port Augusta – reached Port Pirie and the town became well known for having railways built to three gauges.  A substantial broad- and standard-gauge station, Port Pirie Junction, was opened immediately opposite the Solomontown stopping place. No new facilities were built to handle narrow-gauge traffic. The "Solomontown" sign was removed, however, because the new Junction station now encompassed Solomontown. Soon afterwards, the Port Pirie Council succeeded in having the South Australian Railways append "Solomontown" under "Port Pirie Junction" on signboards on the new station's platform and signal box. In colloquial use among both residents of Port Pirie and railway employees, "Solomontown" was applied to the new station as well as the old one.

By 1967, long-distance broad-gauge and standard-gauge passenger trains had become much longer than the Port Pirie Junction platforms, necessitating a new station at Mary Elie Street, 1.6 km (1.0 mi) away. The following year, the Junction station was demolished and the track surrounding it, including that of the narrow-gauge stop, was reconfigured, consigning the infrastructure to history.

Previous stations: Port Pirie South; Ellen Street.

Concurrent stations: Port Pirie Junction (collocated with Solomontown); Ellen Street.Subsequent station: Mary Elie Street.

See also
South Australian Railways
Transport in South Australia

Notes

References

Port Pirie
Buildings and structures in Port Pirie
Railway stations in South Australia
Railway stations opened in 1911